The World Unseen is the fourth studio album by American post-rock band Mamiffer. The album was announced in December 2015 streamed in late March 2016, and released through SIGE Records on April 1, 2016. The album was recorded mixed and produced by Randall Dunn at Avast! Studios in Seattle with final mastering by Jason Ward.

Reception

The album gained generally positive reviews upon release. Thomas Howells of Crack Magazine called The World Unseen a "wholly affective—and deeply satisfying—sonic experience." Dylan Schink said the album was "incredibly rich... expertly put together to create a deeply rewarding and unforgettable experience."

Track listing
All compositions written by Faith Coloccia. Lyrics by Coloccia and Aaron Turner.
 "By the Light of My Body" – 2:37
 "Flower of the Field II" – 3:46
 "13 Burning Stars" – 4:54
 "Mara" – 5:37
 "Domestication of the Ewe I (Est Ovum)" – 10:02
 "Domestication of the Ewe II (Höhle)" – 5:41
 "Domestication of the Ewe III (Divine Virus)" – 11:14
 "Parthenogenesis" – 4:02

Japanese edition bonus disc
 "Aušrinė" – 2:42
 "We Are United In Spirit, We Will Be Happy Forever" – 4:45
 "Mercy II" – 7:05

Personnel

Mamiffer
 Faith Coloccia – piano, vocals, choral arrangement, organ, Wurlitzer organ, bass synthesizer, noise, tapes, effects, sound collage
 Aaron Turner – guitar, effects, loops, feedback, noise, sound collage

Additional musicians
 Eyvind Kang – viola, string arrangement
 Geneviève Beaulieu – additional vocals on track 6
 Joe Preston – bass on track 6

Production
 Randall Dunn – producer, mixing, engineering
 Jason Ward – mastering
 Faith Coloccia – artwork, design

References

2016 albums
Mamiffer albums